Glen Joseph Trifiro (born 10 July 1987) is an Australian professional footballer who plays as a central midfielder for Sydney United 58 in the National Premier Leagues.

Career
After playing for several years with various state league clubs in NSW and Victoria, Trifiro signed on loan from Sydney United with the Central Coast Mariners in the A-League during the January Transfer Window. Following impressive performances, he was handed a one-year contract to play on with the club into the next season. Trifiro became the first ever FFA Cup goalscorer for the Mariners in August 2014, scoring the only goal of the round of 32 game against South Coast Wolves.

Trifiro was released by the Mariners on 1 March 2016.

Honours
With Sydney United:
  National Premier Leagues NSW Championship: 2020
  National Premier Leagues NSW Premiership: 2013, 2016
  Waratah Cup: 2016

Personal life
Glen is the brother of former Melbourne City midfielder Jason Trifiro.

The brothers run a football clinic called Futboltec. Its aims are to improve the technical aspects of young players' game, including passing, finishing, and overall awareness.

References

External links
 

Living people
1989 births
Australian soccer players
Australia youth international soccer players
Australia under-20 international soccer players
Association football midfielders
A-League Men players
Perth Glory FC players
Central Coast Mariners FC players
Marconi Stallions FC players
Macarthur Rams FC players
Sydney United 58 FC players
Bankstown Berries FC players
Northcote City FC players
South Melbourne FC players
National Premier Leagues players
Australian people of Italian descent